Stefan Strobel is a Paralympic athlete from Germany competing mainly in category T51 marathon events.

Stefan competed in the 200 m and marathon at the 2004 Summer Paralympics winning the silver medal behind Italy's Alvise De Vidi in the Marathon.

References

Paralympic athletes of Germany
Athletes (track and field) at the 2004 Summer Paralympics
Paralympic silver medalists for Germany
Living people
World record holders in Paralympic athletics
Medalists at the 2004 Summer Paralympics
Year of birth missing (living people)
Paralympic medalists in athletics (track and field)